Parliamentary elections were held in Laos on 25 December 1955 to elect members of the National Assembly, the lower chamber of Parliament. The result was a victory for the ruling National Progressive Party, which won 22 of the 39 seats. Voter turnout was 75.6%.

Results
Elections were only held in ten of the twelve provinces.

References

Laos
Elections in Laos
1955 in Laos
Election and referendum articles with incomplete results